Víctor Jesús Alfredo Loyola Pando (born 22 June 1981) is a Chilean retired footballer who played as a goalkeeper and occasionally as a forward.

Football career
Born in Santiago, Loyola started his career with local Colo-Colo, spending five seasons at the club which included a loan at Unión Española. He subsequently joined Deportes Puerto Montt.

In 2006, Loyola signed for Santiago Morning. On 25 November 2009, in the last minute of the Clausura away fixture against Audax Italiano (where he had previously played on loan), he scored through a header in an eventual 1–2 loss and semi-finals qualification on the away goals rule, after having been brought on as a substitute forward by manager Juan Antonio Pizzi.

Santiago Morning also loaned Loyola to Cobreloa. On 22 May 2011, back with the latter but now as a goalkeeper, he netted his team's goal in a 1–1 Apertura home draw precisely against the former, in another injury-time header. On 15 June, in a friendly with former side Colo-Colo, his individual effort was the game's first goal in a 2–1 win, and he also announced his intention to spend the following Clausura entirely as a forward; on 10 July, for the Copa Chile, the forward scored his second goal since being fully reconverted by manager Fernando Díaz, in a 1–1 draw at Unión San Felipe.

Loyola retired midway through 2012 at the age of 31, due to numerous back problems.

Honours
Colo-Colo
Primera División de Chile: 2002 Clausura

References

External links

Football-Lineups profile

1981 births
Living people
Footballers from Santiago
Chilean footballers
Association football goalkeepers
Association football forwards
Association football utility players
Chilean Primera División players
Primera B de Chile players
Unión Española footballers
Colo-Colo footballers
Puerto Montt footballers
Santiago Morning footballers
Audax Italiano footballers
Cobreloa footballers